Filip Kostić (born 8 October 1993) is a Serbian football striker who plays for ASK Elektra in Austria. 

At the moment Filip is playing in Austria, amateur football. Last few seasons he played for FC Stadlau, SC Süsenbrunn, FavAC and FC Bisamberg. He also studies Art History on the University of Vienna.

References

1993 births
Living people
Sportspeople from Loznica
Association football forwards
Serbian footballers
Serbian expatriate footballers
FK Loznica players
FK Radnički Klupci players
Budapest Honvéd FC players
FK Javor Ivanjica players
FK Mladost Velika Obarska players
FK Drina Zvornik players
FK Podrinje Janja players
Favoritner AC players
Serbian SuperLiga players
Serbian expatriate sportspeople in Hungary
Serbian expatriate sportspeople in Bosnia and Herzegovina
Serbian expatriate sportspeople in Austria
Expatriate footballers in Hungary
Expatriate footballers in Bosnia and Herzegovina
Expatriate footballers in Austria